La Maison Troisgros is a Michelin Guide three-starred restaurant in Roanne, France north west of the city of Lyon. Head chef, Michel Troisgros of the Troisgros family, runs the hotel/restaurant along with his wife Marie-Pierre.

In 1930, Burgundy native Jean-Baptiste Troisgros moved to Roanne with his wife, Marie, and bought a small hotel.  She did the cooking, he oversaw the house.  This was the beginning of a 3-generation dynasty of gastronomy that has seen La Maison Troisgros celebrate more than 30 consecutive years with three Michelin stars.

Marie and Jean-Baptiste had two famous chef sons, Jean and Pierre among the inventors of nouvelle cuisine. Michel Trosgros is one of two celebrated chef sons (the other is Claude) of Pierre. In this generation Michel is the cook and his wife Marie-Pierre (they met while she was studying hotel management in Grenoble) looks after the house, the decor and the shop.

Michel's cuisine is noted both for its internationalism (there are many Japanese touches) and its use of local ingredients (red currants in summer, for example). He is also known for his enthusiastic use of acidic notes in his dishes.

Pierre Troisgros once noted that the restaurant used to be identified as being across the street from the train station. Now people identify the station as across the street from La Maison Troisgros. This says something about both the fame of the hotel/restaurant and the relative quietude of the town of Roanne.

The restaurant was voted 25th best in the world in Restaurant (magazine) Top 50 2008.

References

External links
Maison Troisgros Official Website
Cuisine(s) Michel Troisgros (in Japan) Official Website
World's 50 Best Restaurants
Dining : Thoroughly modern French
The New York Times / En Route: France; Visiting an Old Friend, Finding a New Radiance
Cuisine(s) Michel Troisgros in Tokyo/Japan
Troisgros from Roanne and from elsewhere
Maison Troisgros-The Genius of Troisgros

Restaurants in France